Maki-do (満奇洞) is one of three limestone caves located in Niimi, Okayama Prefecture, Japan. Named Dream Palace, the cave is 450 metres long, with a small, underground lake at the furthest end.

Access
The immediate area is only accessible by car or bus, with a short but steep climb to the entrance. It is 30 minutes from the 313 National Highway. Buses leave from JR Ikura Station and take 38 minutes.

Entrance times and fees
The cave is open for inspection from 8:30 am until 5:00 pm, with admissions closing at 4:30 pm. The entrance fee for adults and high school students is 1000 yen, for junior high students 800 yen, and for younger children 500 yen.

References

Tourist attractions in Okayama Prefecture
Show caves in Japan
Landforms of Okayama Prefecture